Scyller J. Borglum is an American politician and engineer from the state of South Dakota. A Republican, Borglum had served in the South Dakota House of Representatives for the 32nd district from 2018 to 2021.

Early life and career
Borglum is from Great Falls, Montana. She graduated from Charles M. Russell High School in 1995, where she was class president and governor of the Montana Youth Legislature. Borglum attended Pacific Lutheran University, where she earned a Bachelor of Business Administration. She received a Fulbright Scholarship, which she used to study oil and gas development in Oslo. After her brother, Troy, died in a traffic collision, Borglum went to Duke Divinity School, and earned a master's degree in theological studies in 2003. She then worked in pharmaceutical sales in Oregon and Texas.

Borglum attended Montana Technological University, where she earned a master's degree in petroleum engineering. She then enrolled at the South Dakota School of Mines and Technology to earn a doctoral degree in geology and geological engineering, while working as a production engineer in an oil field in North Dakota. She also enrolled at Montana Tech to earn a bachelor's degree in engineering, which she needed to become a licensed engineer. She was laid off from her job in 2015, and moved to South Dakota, where she works as a staff engineer at RESPEC.

Political career
In the 2018 elections, Borglum ran to represent the 32nd district in the South Dakota House of Representatives. She and Sean McPherson earned the Republican Party's nomination for the district's two seats, even though McPherson, an incumbent, had died of cancer. Governor Dennis Daugaard appointed Borglum to fill McPherson's vacant seat on August 8. She was elected to a full term in November.

Borglum ran in the Republican primary for the United States Senate against incumbent Mike Rounds in 2020. Rounds defeated Borglum, 75% to 25%.

Personal life
Borglum married Timothy Masterlark, a professor at the South Dakota School of Mines and Technology, in 2018.

References

External links

Year of birth missing (living people)
Living people
Women state legislators in South Dakota
Republican Party members of the South Dakota House of Representatives
21st-century American women politicians
21st-century American politicians
Pacific Lutheran University alumni
South Dakota School of Mines and Technology alumni
Duke Divinity School alumni
Politicians from Great Falls, Montana
Politicians from Rapid City, South Dakota
Montana Technological University alumni
Candidates in the 2020 United States Senate elections